Scincus is a genus of skinks, lizards in the family Scincidae. The genus contains four or five species, all of which are typical desert inhabitants, living in sandy and dune-like areas with a hot and dry climate. Species in the genus Scincus can be found from Arabia to the Sahara desert.

Taxonomy
Scincus is the type genus of the subfamily Scincinae. As the subfamily Scincinae appears to be paraphyletic and is in need of revision, it is as yet undetermined which skink genera are closely enough related to Scincus to be retained in the Scincinae. (Austin & Arnold 2006).

Species
The genus Scincus contains five species which are recognized as being valid.
Scincus albifasciatus 
Scincus conirostris  – sandfish skink
Scincus hemprichii 
Scincus mitranus  – eastern sandfish or eastern skink
Scincus scincus  – common sandfish or common skink
  
Nota bene: A binomial authority in parentheses indicates that the species was originally described in a genus other than Scincus.

References

Further reading
 (2006). "Using ancient and recent DNA to explore relationships of extinct and endangered Leiolopisma skinks (Reptilia: Scincidae) in the Mascarene islands". Molecular Phylogenetics and Evolution 39 (2): 503–511.  (HTML abstract).

Scincus
Lizard genera
Taxa named by Josephus Nicolaus Laurenti